The Kwan Tei River is a river in northeastern New Territories, Hong Kong. Its source is from the Lau Shui Heung Reservoir. The river flows through Lau Shui Heung Village and underneath Sha Tau Kok Road before joining the Ng Tung River near Kwan Tei Pei Village.

See also
List of rivers and nullahs in Hong Kong

References
2007. 2007 Hong Kong Map. Easy Finder Ltd.

External links
Rivers of Hong Kong, in Chinese

Rivers of Hong Kong
North District, Hong Kong